Cathal Daniels (born 13 September 1996) is an Irish eventing rider. A two-time championship medalist, he won a team silver medal at the 2018 World Equestrian Games, and an individual bronze medal at the 2019 European Championships.

Daniels won several medals at the European pony, junior and young riders eventing championships from 2012 to 2017, including one individual and three team gold medals.

CCI***** Results

International Championship Results

References

Living people
1996 births
Irish male equestrians
20th-century Irish people
21st-century Irish people